Acroloxus is a genus of very small, air-breathing, freshwater snails, or more precisely limpets, aquatic pulmonate gastropods in the family Acroloxidae.

Species
Species in the genus Acroloxus include:
 Acroloxus coloradensis J. Henderson, 1930 - Rocky Mountain capshell
 Acroloxus egirdirensis Shirokaya, 2012
 Acroloxus improvisus Polinski, 1929
 Acroloxus lacustris (Linnaeus, 1758) - Lake limpet
 Acroloxus macedonicus Hadžišce, 1959
 Acroloxus pseudolacustris, Glöer & Pešić, 2012
 Acroloxus tetensi (Kušcer, 1832)

References 

Acroloxidae
Gastropod genera
Taxonomy articles created by Polbot